José Jorge Loayza (April 23, 1827 – May 28, 1904) was a Peruvian lawyer, judge and politician. He was born in Lima, Peru. Loayza served as minister of finance in 1865, foreign affairs and justice in the Government of Peru. He was three times Prime Minister of Peru (1872, June–December 1878, May 1898-September 1899).

Bibliography
 Basadre, Jorge: Historia de la República del Perú. 1822 - 1933, Octava Edición, corregida y aumentada. Tomos 5 y 6. Editada por el Diario "La República" de Lima y la Universidad "Ricardo Palma". Impreso en Santiago de Chile, 1998.
 Tauro del Pino, Alberto: Enciclopedia Ilustrada del Perú. Tercera Edición. Tomo 10. LLO/MEN. Lima, PEISA, 2001.

References

1827 births
1904 deaths
19th-century Peruvian judges
People from Lima
Peruvian Ministers of Economy and Finance
Foreign ministers of Peru
Peruvian Ministers of Justice
Presidents of the Supreme Court of Peru
Prime Ministers of Peru